Kingfisher Lake 1 is a First Nations reserve in Kenora District, Ontario. It is one of the reserves of the Kingfisher First Nation.

References

Oji-Cree reserves in Ontario
Communities in Kenora District